The Fugitives are a Canadian Folk music group formed in 2004 in Vancouver. The members of the band are Brendan McLeod (guitar and vocals) and Adrian Glynn(vocals, guitar, lap steel, balalaika). Former members of the band included Mark Berube (banjo and vocals), C.R. Avery (beat box and vocals), and Barbara Adler  (vocals, accordion) who left the band to pursue other artistic ventures. Although C.R. Avery is not a member of the band anymore, he still plays with them occasionally, most recently in 2011 at the Vogue Theatre in Vancouver.

Fans and critics find the group difficult to classify—they have been categorized as slam folk, folk hop, and spoken word cabaret. The Georgia Straight called The Fugitives "wildly talented spoken-word artists".

Discography
Shadowbox Choir (2003)
In Streetlight Communion (2007)
Face of Impurity (2007)
Find Me (2009)
Eccentrically We Love (2010)
Bigger than Luck (EP) (2013)
Everything Will Happen (2013)
 Trench Songs (2020)

References

External links
Fugitives official website

Musical groups established in 2004
Musical groups from Vancouver
Canadian folk music groups
Canadian spoken word artists
2004 establishments in British Columbia